The European Thesaurus on International Relations and Area Studies (abbreviated: European Thesaurus) is a multilingual, interdisciplinary thesaurus covering the subject fields of International Relations and Area Studies. The European Thesaurus consists of about 8.200 descriptors organised in 24 subdomains. To enhance the access to the thesaurus’ controlled vocabulary the descriptors are arranged both alphabetically as well as systematically. The semantic relationships (equivalence, hierarchy, association) between all individual descriptors have been established. The European Thesaurus is intended to be used primarily in bibliographic databases for indexing and retrieval of professional literature from the relevant domains. The European Thesaurus can, in addition, even serve as a terminological reference work and/or as a translation tool in international affairs matters.

The European Thesaurus was developed by an international working group in the framework of a terminology cooperation project carried out by the European Information Network on International Relations and Area Studies (EINIRAS).

The European Thesaurus is available in nine languages: Croatian, Czech, English, French, German, Italian, Polish, Russian, Spanish. A Greek version is currently being translated.

At present the European Thesaurus is applied by academic organisations and research institutes in Germany  (German Information Network International Relations and Area Studies – database World Affairs Online –), the Czech Republic (Institute of International Relations Prague) and Poland (Polish Institute of International Affairs, Warsaw). The European Thesaurus is updated regularly.

The European Thesaurus is publicly accessible via the academic internet portal IREON (International RElations and area studies ONline).

References
 European Thesaurus on International Relations and Area Studies / Thésaurus Européen Relations internationales et études régionales / Europäischer Thesaurus Internationale Beziehungen und Länderkunde / Tesauro Europeo Relaciones Internacionales y Estudios Regionales / Tesauro Europeo di Relazioni internazionali e studi regionali / Evropský tezaurus mezinárodních vztahů a regionálních studií / Europejski Tezaurus Stosunków Międzynarodowych i Studiów Regionalnych, Berlin 2006. 
 Kluck, Michael; Huckstorf, Axel: The Multilingual European Thesaurus on International Relations and Area Studies – A Multilingual Resource for Indexing, Retrieval, and Translation. In: European Language Resources Association (ed.): Proceedings of the Sixth International Language Resources and Evaluation Conference, 28-30 May 2008, Marrakech 2008.
 Huckstorf, Axel: The Multilingual European Thesaurus on International Relations and Area Studies. An Example of Successful European Terminology Co-operation. In: Nistrup Madsen, Bodil; Erdman Thomsen, Hanne (eds.): Managing Ontologies and Lexical Resources: TKE 2008. 8th International Conference on Terminology and Knowledge Engineering, Copenhagen 2008, pp. 43-60.

External links
 German Information Network International Relations and Area Studies¨
The Geneva School of Diplomacy & International Relations

Thesauri
International relations
Terminology